The Beautyful Ones Are Not Yet Born is a jazz album by Branford Marsalis, leading a trio with Jeff "Tain" Watts and Robert Hurst and with guest appearances from Wynton Marsalis and Courtney Pine. It was recorded May 16–18, 1991, at CTS Studio A, Wembley, England, and June 24, 1991, at RCA Studio B in New York, New York. It peaked at number 3 on the Top Jazz Albums chart.

Calling it "one of Branford Marsalis' strongest of the 1990s", Scott Yanow notes in his AllMusic review: "His playing is often reminiscent in style (but not really sound) of John Coltrane, he is more concise and disciplined than in some of his early-'90s concert appearances and [h3] is at his most explorative on this inventive blowing session." Other reviewers concurred. People called Marsalis's tone "rich and round… his phrasing and rhythm beautifully fluid." Entertainment Weekly gave a slightly more nuanced review, calling the recording "a very long and uncompromising trio recital in which Marsalis [demonstrates] his own stunning command of tenor and soprano sax. Indeed, if anything the album is too pure: The strain of improvising with only the spartan sound of bass and drums for support ultimately gets wearying…"

The album's title references the 1968 novel of the same name by Ghanaian writer Ayi Kwei Armah.

Track listing

Personnel
 Branford Marsalis - saxophones
 Jeff "Tain" Watts - drums
 Robert Hurst - bass
 Wynton Marsalis - trumpet on "Cain & Abel"
 Courtney Pine - tenor saxophone on "Dewey Baby"

References

External links
 BranfordMarsalis.com 

1991 albums
Branford Marsalis albums
Albums produced by George Butler (record producer)